Atla is a village in Saaremaa Parish, Saare County in western Estonia. It is the westernmost settlement of Estonia.

Before the administrative reform in 2017, the village was in Lääne-Saare Parish.

References

Villages in Saare County